DIMP (developmental code name Ro 7-8117), or N-(3,5-dimethyl-4-isoxazolylmethyl)phthalimide, is a nonsteroidal antiandrogen (NSAA) structurally related to thalidomide (which also binds to and antagonizes the androgen receptor (AR)) that was first described in 1973 and was never marketed. Along with flutamide, it was one of the earliest NSAAs to be discovered, and for this reason, has been described as a "classical" NSAA. The drug is a selective, competitive, silent antagonist of the AR, although it is described as an "only relatively weak competitor". Its relative binding affinity for the androgen receptor is about 2.6% of that of metribolone. DIMP possesses no androgenic, estrogenic, progestogenic, or antigonadotropic activity, but it does reverse the antigonadotropic effects of testosterone, indicating that, like other pure AR antagonists, it is progonadotropic.

DIMP is the lead antiandrogen of the phthalimide group of nonsteroidal AR ligands, and a variety of AR ligands with higher affinity for the AR have been derived from DIMP and thalidomide.

See also
 AA560
 BOMT

References

Abandoned drugs
Isoxazoles
Nonsteroidal antiandrogens
Phthalimides
Progonadotropins